Eleonora de Mendonça (born 13 November 1948) is a Brazilian long-distance runner. She competed in the women's marathon at the 1984 Summer Olympics.

References

1948 births
Living people
Athletes (track and field) at the 1984 Summer Olympics
Brazilian female long-distance runners
Brazilian female marathon runners
Olympic athletes of Brazil
Place of birth missing (living people)